The Yellow Balloon was an American sunshine pop band, formed in Los Angeles in 1967 by songwriter and producer Gary Zekley. The group is notable for featuring Don Grady (sometimes billed as "Luke R. Yoo") of The Mickey Mouse Club and My Three Sons fame. Other band members hailed from Oregon and Arizona. They were led by Alex Valdez (lead singer), and included Frosty Green (keyboards), Don Braucht (bass guitar), and Paul Canella (lead guitar). The band at one time also included Daryl Dragon, later the male half of Captain & Tennille.

The Yellow Balloon released multiple singles, including their hit "Yellow Balloon" which peaked at #25 on the Billboard 100 Chart and "Good Feelin' Time," which peaked at #1 on the Bubbling Under Hot 100 extension chart. Both are taken from the group's debut album.

The band's 1967 self-titled LP was released through Canterbury Records and besides featuring the hit single "Yellow Balloon", also included two songs co-written by former The Mamas & the Papas singer Jill Gibson. The album was re-released in 1998 as a CD by Sundazed Music, including all eleven songs from the original album, a few songs Grady released as singles, a demo, and a Zekley recorded interview conducted by the music historian Domenic Priore.

The group disbanded soon after their first release, when further success eluded them. Band members felt they had nothing new to produce, so the breakup was amicable.

Discography

References

External links
 Unofficial Fan Website  
 Unofficial Gary Zekley Website
  1998 CD Website 
 Canterbury Records
 Sundazed Records

American pop music groups
Musical groups established in 1967
Musical groups from Los Angeles
Sunshine pop